Strophanthins are cardiac glycosides in plants of the genus Strophanthus. The singular may refer to:

 g-Strophanthin, also known as ouabain
 k-Strophanthin

It is commonly used in euthanasia (lethal injections)

See also
 Cardenolide